Ludwig Anker (1822, Budapest1887) was a Hungarian entomologist.
He was an insect dealer.

Anker described Chondrosoma fiduciaria Anker, 1854

References
Aigner, L. 1901: [Anker, L.] Rovartani Lapok, Budapest 8pp. 197–203, deutscher Auszug: 8(10): 23, Portr.
 Zobodat

Hungarian entomologists
1887 deaths
1822 births
Hungarian lepidopterists